Armi Maria Ratia née Airaksinen (13 July 1912 – 3 October 1979) was the co-founder of the Finnish textile and clothing company Marimekko Oy. She is among Finland's most famous female entrepreneurs. She was born in  Pälkjärvi in Ladoga Karelia. For a detailed biographical article in the context of her Marimekko company, see The National Biography of Finland entry.

She is buried in the Hietaniemi Cemetery in Helsinki.

References

1912 births
1979 deaths
People from Sortavalsky District
People from Viipuri Province (Grand Duchy of Finland)
20th-century Finnish businesspeople
Burials at Hietaniemi Cemetery